Langrishe, Go Down, the novel by Aidan Higgins (1966), was adapted for the screen by Harold Pinter, directed by David Jones, filmed for BBC Television in association with Raidió Teilifís Éireann, and first broadcast in September 1978 as a 90-minute BBC2's Play of the Week.  On 17 July, 2002, Langrishe, Go Down was re-released as a theatrical 16mm feature film, after being shown in The Spaces Between the Words: A Tribute to Harold Pinter, by the Film Society of Lincoln Center, as part of the Harold Pinter Festival of the Lincoln Center Festival 2001, held at Lincoln Center for the Performing Arts, in New York City, from 21 to 31 July 2001.

Credits 
Screenplay: Harold Pinter, from the novel by Aidan Higgins
Director: David Jones
Original score: Carl Davis
Photography: Elmer Cossey
Designer: Roger Murray-Leach
Sound Recordist: Graham Hare

Cast 
Imogen Langrishe: Judi Dench
Otto Beck: Jeremy Irons
Helen Langrishe: Annette Crosbie
Lily Langrishe: Susan Williamson
Maureen Layde: Margaret Whiting
Barry Shannon: Harold Pinter

Setting 
The setting is a fading Irish mansion in the Kilkenny countryside, in the late 1930s, and also includes some locations in Dublin.

Plot synopsis 
Three spinster sisters, Imogene (Dench), Helen (Crosbie), and Lily Langrishe (Williamson), lose their equanimity — and in the case of Imogene her virginity — when a mature German student (Jeremy Irons) rents lodging from them while he works on his thesis.

Home media
The film was released on DVD in Australia by MRA Entertainment.

Notes

External links 

1978 television films
1978 films
1978 drama films
1978 television plays
BBC television dramas
Films directed by David Jones
Films scored by Carl Davis
Films with screenplays by Harold Pinter